Before Love Has Gone is a studio album by jazz vocalist Stevie Holland. The album is Holland's sixth and was released by 150 Music on June 24, 2008. It was chosen as a "Critic's Pick of the Year" by USA Today.

Track listing

Personnel
 Todd Barkan, Tim Peierls, and Gary William Friedman, producers
 Gary William Friedman, arrangements
 Martin Bejerano, piano
 Edward Perez, bass
 Willie Jones, III, drums
 Ole Mathisen, tenor saxophone
 Paul Bollenback, guitar

References

2008 albums
Stevie Holland albums